The following is a list of all State Routes that have existed in the U.S. state of Nevada since July 1, 1976. All active state-numbered highways in this list are maintained by the Nevada Department of Transportation.


Primary routes (0–499)
Primary state routes are assigned three-digit numbers based upon the county in which the majority of the route resides (or, in some instances, the county of the major town on the route). State routes in a county are grouped together with similar numbers, which are assigned in order based upon alphabetical order of county names. SR 28, SR 88 and SR 140 are the three exceptions to this numbering scheme—all three are highways that continue into an adjoining state, making SR 28 and SR 88 the only state highways assigned a two-digit number.

Urban routes (500–699)
Urban state routes, numbered in the 500s and 600s, typically lie on arterial roadways in larger metropolitan areas. Urban state routes are grouped together sequentially, assigned by alphabetical order of the name of the city in which they primarily reside.

Nevada DOT has been attempting to remove some urban routes from the state highway system since the 1990s, preferring to transfer control of these roadways to local municipalities. This is especially apparent in Carson City, where all of the city's state routes have been gradually removed since 2011.

Secondary routes (700–895)
Minor state routes, numbered in the 700s and 800s, chiefly exist to connect smaller rural communities to other state highways. In some small urban areas, these routes can also serve as minor collector or arterial roadways.

Like primary state routes, minor state routes are grouped sequentially in alphabetical order by county name.

See also

List of state routes in Nevada prior to 1976
List of Interstate Highways in Nevada
List of U.S. Routes in Nevada
Nevada Scenic Byways

References

Nevada Department of Transportation, Historical Maps
University of Nevada, Reno, Nevada in Maps: Nevada Highway Maps - 1917-2005

External links

Nevada Highways @ AARoads
Nevada Department of Transportation

 
State